The 2017–18 Bahraini Premier League (also known as NBB Bahrain League for sponsorship reasons), was the 61st top-level football season in Bahrain.

League table

References

Bahraini Premier League seasons
1
Bah